New Extreme Films (New Extremity or, also often, New French Extremity) describes a range of transgressive films made at the turn of the 21st century that caused scandal and controversy, and provoked significant debate and discussion. They were notable for including graphic images of violence, especially sexual violence and rape, as well as explicit sexual imagery. 

The films cannot be described as part of a movement or a wave, and the term ‘new extreme’ was never assumed by filmmakers. The term ‘extreme’ tends moreover to apply to individual films rather than filmmakers, with many directors only making a single film that might be considered new extreme. Rather, the term ‘new extreme’ was adopted by critics, scholars, and viewers to describe a cinematic trend for graphic sexual and violent imagery, especially in France but across Europe more generally beginning in the late 1990s.

Notable Films 

A Hole in My Heart (2004). Lukas Moodysson

A New Life. 2002. Philippe Grandrieux.

A Serbian Film. 2010. Srđan Spasojević. 

Anatomy of Hell. 2004. Catherine Breillat.

Antichrist. 2009. Lars von Trier.

Baise-moi. 2000. Virginie Despentes and Coralie Trinh-Thi. 

Battle in Heaven. 2005. Carlos Reygadas.

Climax. 2018. Gaspar Noé.

Clip. 2012. Maja Miloš. 

Enter The Void. 2009. Gaspar Noé. 

Fat Girl. 2001. Catherine Breillat. 

Free Will. 2006. Matthias Glasner. 

Holiday. 2018. Isabella Eklöf. 

I Stand Alone. 1998. Gaspar Noé.

Import/Export. 2007. Ulrich Seidl.

In My Skin. 2002. Marina de Van. 

Intimacy. 2001. Patrice Chéreau. 

Irreversible. 2002. Gaspar Noé. 

My Mother. 2004. Christophe Honoré. 

Nymphomaniac. 2013. Lars von Trier.

Pola X. 1999. Leos Carax.

Raw. 2016. Julia Ducournau.

Romance. 1999. Catherine Breillat. 

See the Sea. 1997. François Ozon.

Sombre. 1999. Philippe Grandrieux.

Taxidermia. 2006. György Pálfi. 

The Brown Bunny. 2003. Vincent Gallo. 

The Idiots. 1998. Lars von Trier. 

The Piano Teacher. 2001. Michael Haneke. 

The Tribe. 2014. Myroslav Slaboshpytskiy. 

Trouble Every Day. 2001. Claire Denis. 

Twentynine Palms. 2003. Bruno Dumont. 

We Fuck Alone. 2006. Gaspar Noé.

Terminology 
The term ‘new French extremity’ was first coined by critic James Quandt in 2004 in a deeply critical piece complaining about the violent turn that French filmmaking appeared to have take in the late 1990s and early 2000s. While few people have taken Quandt’s hyperbolic pronouncements about new extreme films seriously, his bombastic eminently-quotable article has become the first reference for talking about these films: “Bava as much as Bataille, Salò no less than Sade seem the determinants of a cinema suddenly determined to break every taboo, to wade in rivers of viscera and spumes of sperm, to fill each frame with flesh, nubile or gnarled, and subject it to all manner of penetration, mutilation, and defilement.” Today, most critics and scholars use Quandt’s claims as a starting point for how not to talk about new extreme films, with his work having assumed something of a ‘straw man’ status. He is criticised for his dismissive tone, his reductive amalgamation of a wide variety of quite different films, his reactionary nostalgia for the old transgressive films, and his unhelpful conflation of films marked by an arthouse style with new French horror, a series of generically-marked horror films. Given Quandt’s influence on subsequent framings of new extreme films, the dismissive reductiveness of his original article is a disappointment. 

Since then, substantial work done on these films has produced a variety of overlapping terms to describe the films mentioned above and others like them: ‘New European Extremism’, ‘extreme cinema’, ‘extreme art cinema’, ‘new extremism’, as well as a ‘cinéma du corps’, the ‘unwatchable’, and ‘transgressive art films’. Importantly, the trend is acknowledged to extend beyond the borders of France to Europe, and in some cases further afield, even as French filmmakers dominate any list of new extreme films. 

In general, ‘extreme’ refers both to the kinds of acts depicted in the films, and the manner in which they are depicted. Acts that frequently occur in new extreme films, which are considered extreme, include visible sex (sometimes called unsimulated sex), sexual and sexualised violence, and graphic images of violence. (Torture is not a feature of new extreme films, being more common in horror films, especially spectacle horror.) According to Oliver Kenny, visibility, proximity, and duration are the key defining stylistic aspects to the presentation of these acts: they are shown in proximate and visible detail, often in lengthy scenes or in long take. Certain scholars, such as Frey and Kenny, have also explored the contemporary use of the word ‘extreme’ in much greater detail. 

The ‘new’ in ‘new extreme’ suggests that these films constitute a new wave, that develops upon a series of ‘old’ extreme films. While films were rarely described as ‘extreme’ prior to the 2000s, the ‘old’ films in question here are mostly violent, politically engaged, films from the 1960s and 1970s. The most commonly cited films as ‘older’ comparisons to ‘new’ extreme cinema are Weekend and Salò.

Filmmakers asked about their thoughts on the term ‘new extreme’ often try to distance themselves from it. In particular the conflation of arthouse films with generically-marked horror films leads to suspicion: as director Julia Ducournau remarked, “the only reason they link us together is because we are all French”. This is another reason why Quandt’s original article has attracted so much criticism: aside from what one might think about new extreme films, they should not be lumped together with horror films like Martyrs and High Tension, which function in a fundamentally different way. Indeed Quandt acknowledged his overly simplistic categorisation of all recent violent French films in a later chapter reflecting on his initial intervention: “‘Flesh and Blood’ became a lesson in the dangers of online apprehension, with the distressing effect of relegating complex artists to a false or constricting taxonomy […] Critical distance allowed by half a decade – an eternity in contemporary culture – reveals some of the article’s obvious faults, including its confusion of the specific genre of French horror, which quickly established its own distinctive sanguinary terroir, with its art-house confraternity.”

History 

Sex and violence have long been a part of art and literary history so there is a wealth of writing that may or may not have had an influence on contemporary cinema. Some of the most commonly discussed literary and artistic reference points for scholars and critics looking at extreme cinema include the Marquis de Sade and his many sexual, violent, and sexually violent novels, Gustave Courbet and his painting L’origine du monde, Antonin Artaud’s writing about the Theatre of Cruelty, and Georges Bataille’s work on erotism and transgression. More recently, a trend towards graphic depictions of sex and violence in literature, sometimes under the moniker contemporary extreme has been associated with writers such as Henry Miller, Bret Easton Ellis, Michel Houellebecq, Marie Darrieussecq, Richard Morgiève, Alina Reyes, and others.

In a cinematic context, it is an established practice to mix supposedly ‘low-brow’ forms of popular expression with ‘high-brow’ filmmaking, notably by including sexual and violent imagery in arthouse films. Art cinema has long been seen as drawing its aesthetics and narrative tropes from forms of eroticism and depictions of the body that transgress mainstream rules such as those of Hollywood. Indeed many now-canonic French and Italian art films of the 1960s and 1970s were marketed together with exploitation films in the USA because their graphic depiction of nudity was considered to exclude them from the status of art film. 

There is a huge range of experimental filmmaking from Europe and elsewhere that has influenced new extreme films (most notably explored by Tim Palmer). Specifically in terms of sexual and violent imagery, 20th-century films that are often considered as precursors to contemporary extreme cinema include Un Chien Andalou (Buñuel & Dalí 1929), Salò, Or the 120 Days of Sodom (Pasolini 1975), The Virgin Spring (Bergman 1960), Belle de Jour (Buñuel 1967), Weekend (Godard, 1967), Straw Dogs (Peckinpah, 1971), The Mother and the Whore (Eustache, 1973), Cannibal Holocaust (Deodato, 1980), Possession (Żuławski, 1981), and A Nos Amours (Pialat, 1983). Tim Palmer also suggests other precursors such as Window Water Baby Moving (Brakhage 1959), Christmas on Earth (Rubin 1963), Flaming Creatures (Smith 1963), and Fuses (Schneeman 1967).

The most direct and influential presence looming over contemporary European extremity are the films of Michael Haneke, who may be considered as something of a godfather of new extremity. Haneke’s films have become very well known for their self-reflective approach to violence – especially The Seventh Continent, 71 Fragments of a Chronology of Chance, Benny’s Video, Funny Games, Hidden, and The Piano Teacher. Scholars often read these films as explorations of violence and spectatorship: the films’ “aesthetic reflexivity is conducive to the spectator’s moral reflexivity”, and they also present cultural-political critiques of society, “it is not just the violence depicted in or by cinematic and other audiovisual images but the violence of conventional cinematic representation that Haneke’s films diagnose and criticise”. Similar analyses will later be made of new extreme films, however, with a few key exceptions, Haneke tends to avoid the direct depiction of violence – whilst his films can be considered extremely violent, there is relatively little on-screen violence, because the ear is “a more direct route to the imagination”. In their didactic approach to the spectator, their repeated emphasis on spectacles of violence, and the possibility of reading them as aesthetic, ethical, social, and political critiques, Haneke’s 1990s and early 2000s films constitute an important backdrop to new extreme films, and their more graphic imagery.

Themes and characteristics

The body 
New extreme films are especially known for their intimate and challenging images of bodies, what Tim Palmer has called a ‘brutal intimacy’ and a ‘cinema of the body’, films “that deal frankly and graphically with the body, and corporeal transgressions, […] whose basic agenda is an on-screen interrogation of physicality in brutally intimate terms”. This attention to discomfiting images of corporeality goes beyond films that might be considered extreme, but it does aptly describe the approach to sex and violence in new extreme films: 

“This cinéma du corps consists of arthouse dramas and thrillers with deliberately discomfiting features: dispassionate physical encounters involving filmed sex that is sometimes unsimulated; physical desire embodied by the performances of actors or nonprofessionals as harshly insular; intimacy itself depicted as fundamentally aggressive, devoid of romance, lacking a nurturing instinct or empathy of any kind; and social relationships that disintegrate in the face of such violent compulsions.”

Rape and sexual assault 
One of the defining characteristics of new extreme films is the spectacular depiction of sexual violence, especially rape. Emblematic of this is the 10-minute rape scene in the middle of Irreversible, when the camera remains static for most of the scene while Alex (Monica Bellucci) is anally raped and then almost beaten to death by her assailant. Lengthy scenes of rape are also a key feature of A Serbian Film, Baise-moi, Fat Girl, Free Will, Holiday, Romance, The Tribe, and Twentynine Palms. As Dominique Russell notes, “these directors’ engagement with rape and its on-screen representation is part of their engagement with art cinema itself”, or more polemically, Olivier Joyard contends that “it’s unbelievable but it’s like this: rape is a trashy, chic experience, a trendy aesthetic loop-the-loop, the dark horizon of modernity'. 

New extreme films have been very controversial for their sexually violent imagery. As well as issues with censorship and audience walk-outs (see section on controversy), scholars have noted many concerning elements with how rape and sexual assault are presented in these films. Most notably, how rape is used as an aesthetic element – in order to create shock and exhilaration in the spectator – and subordinated to political or philosophical purposes, rather than being considered as a physical, literal violation. Indeed, as an act often lacking externally verifiable evidence, and one of the few crimes where the thoughts and desires of both perpetrator and victim are relevant (in distinguishing rape from consensual sex), rape is a “‘perfect crime for film’, dramatiz[ing] questions of subjectivity, storytelling, testimony and interpretation”. New extreme films exploit the affect and legal ambiguity of rape to the fullest extent, creating challenging scenes of sexual violence that are commonly read in terms of their impact on the viewer, rather than in relation to what they have to say about rape in society.

Women and feminism 
Many of the key filmmakers associated with new extreme films are women and have been discussed in terms of their depiction of women: Catherine Breillat, Claire Denis, Virginie Despentes and Coralie Trinh-Thi, Marina de Van and more recently, Julia Ducournau, Maja Miloš, and Isabella Eklöf. Claire Denis is considered one of the great filmmakers of her generation (Beau Travail was voted #7 on Sight and Sound’s Greatest Film Poll 2022), although her new extreme film Trouble Every Day is frequently viewed as an unfortunate aberration. 

Although some of these female filmmakers have tried to downplay their interest in feminism (notably de Van) Breillat and Despentes are important figures in contemporary French discussions around feminism. Much early work in French studies explored how films such as Romance, Fat Girl and Anatomy of Hell depicted female sexuality, the construction of femininity, gender identity, and sexual violence. Baise-moi has been examined in terms of sexual violence – most notably because of its graphic early rape scene which created significant controversy – female sexuality, and the female gaze. In My Skin, Raw, Clip, and Holiday have also all been explored in terms of their depiction of female sexual awakening, gendered power relations, sexual violence, and the construction of gender.  Key issues for feminist film studies including sexuality, sexual violence, the gaze, and gender are repeated concerns for new extreme films, especially those directed by women.

National politics 
Several new extreme films explore contemporary and historical issues relating to the politics of the countries in which they are made: most notably Battle in Heaven, A Serbian Film, and Taxidermia. 

Much analysis of Battle in Heaven reads it in the context of Mexican history and society (Lahr-Vivaz 2016; Ordóñez 2017). The characters are often understood as representative of a two-class system divided between a lighter-skinned dominant class and a darker-skinned lower class: ‘Batalla en el cielo’s opening scene juxtaposes the corporeal rigidity and moral deficiency of Marcos’s brown male figure, with a sensuous and emotionally layered image of Ana, a phenotypically white Mexican woman’. In this reading, the violent and sexual imagery in the film is a cinematic way of making a socio-political critique of Mexican society. 

In publicity interviews for A Serbian Film, director Srđan Spasojević, argued that his film “is a diary of our own molestation by the Serbian government. […] You have to feel the violence to know what it’s about”. Although this argument was frequently ridiculed in the press, and audience research has shown that viewers rarely saw the film as a national allegory unless specifically directed to this reading, it is common to read A Serbian Film as a loose allegory of 21st-century Serbian history. Aida Vidan argues that it “does not directly address war themes, but is a statement on a traumatized society that has lost its voice and identity” and Featherstone & Johnson argue that it “exposes the real of Serbian ethno-nationalism to the harsh light of day and makes it entirely dominant over normal symbolic reality”. 

Taxidermia can be read as an allegory of Hungarian history, with its three sections corresponding loosely to fascist, socialist, and capitalist periods in the country’s past, and how different members of a family come to terms with this political context. György Kalmár argues that the visceral and affectively challenging imagery in the film is about exploring the specifically local character of Hungarian history: Taxidermia evokes a “culturally specific, local sensorium in order to undermine the ideologically laden grand narratives of a homogenized, official History”. Similarly Steven Shaviro connects the film’s depiction of bodies with broader ideas of history: “these body-images are immediately visceral, and indeed disgusting; and yet they are also abstract and allegorical”. 

Although the relation to politics is quite different, this is perhaps one element of crossover between certain new extreme films and new French horror, which has variously been dubbed ‘border horror’ and ‘Sarkozy horror’ by critics. As Alice Haylett Bryan has noted, images of riots in several French horror films are “representative of a much wider political seam that runs through French horror cinema of this period. Initial scholarly writing on these films was quick to position them in relation to French society, providing readings of the films as expressing fears surrounding immigration and the loss of French cultural identity due to the influx of foreign Others”.

Spectatorship 
Many writers who are broadly positive about new extreme films and see a particular ethical or political value in them, identify in the films an engaged mode of spectatorship. In other words, they suggest that new extreme films are ethically/politically engaged because they aggressively destabilise dominant interpretations of sex and violence, and because they challenge spectators to look at the world differently. The disturbing and uncomfortable experience of watching new extreme films is seen as the means by which the films transform ways of seeing – spectatorship is ethical. 

The depiction of sex in Twentynine Palms has been read as revealing ‘alternative, non-pornographic ways of being sexual’ and thereby creates a ‘productive estrangement’ from mainstream and pornographic modes of spectatorship. Baise-moi has been read as presenting “a desire that operates subversively alongside rather than outside of the (masculine) imaginary”, while the films of Catherine Breillat are seen as disrupting “the relations of distance and control, on which viewing has been seen to depend, by her emphasis on the tactile”. Films such as Irreversible, Fat Girl, Trouble Every Day, A New Life, Antichrist, The Idiots have all been read in this way by scholars, suggesting that spectatorship itself can be seen as a central thematic concern for new extreme films.

Unclear and problematic political positions 
New extreme films do not appear to reflect a unified social or political platform. It is not even clear whether one can consider them politically progressive or reactionary, with many arguments put forward by critics and scholars to support both sides. Joan Hawkins summarises audience responses to new extreme films, suggesting that, like many critics, 

“Quandt cannot decide whether they have more in common with the “épater les bourgeois” spirit of the French Surrealists or with the work of the right-wing anarchist hussards of the 1950s. That is, he cannot determine whether the films of these new cinematic provocateurs align politically with the Left or with the Right, whether they are culturally progressive or reactionary. In a sense, like many of the horror films Robin Wood discusses, they are both and it is perhaps this imbrication — or perhaps dialectic — of liberal and conservative tendencies which makes the films so deeply troubling”.

Scholars have also frequently pointed to the difficulty of pinning down the political viewpoints because within the films themselves, the different political or philosophical perspectives are not coherent and clearly linked. Writing about Twentynine Palms, Nikolaj Lübecker suggests that “instead of being a rich and multi-layered film, Twentynine Palms is a raw and edgy one. Instead of watching a work in which the three strands [political, physical, metaphysical] organically combine, we experience an implosion of meaning”. In this sense, Lübecker suggests that new extreme films are ‘doubly transgressive’, because they are first transgressive in terms of their challenging sexual and violent imagery, and then subsequently transgressive because this challenge to the spectator does not appear to serve a straightforwardly ‘emancipatory agenda’. This double transgression is one reason why viewers are so uncomfortable with new extreme films – they appear to challenge the spectator, but it is unclear to what political end. 

Indeed while many scholars have sought to praise new extreme films for their innovative aesthetics, their affective depictions of bodies, and their direct challenge to spectators, their political views have often been questioned as reactionary, if not outright troubling. As well as the criticisms of the depiction of sexual violence mentioned above, Irreversible has been criticised as “the most homophobic movie ever made”, Fat Girl and A Serbian Film were cut in the UK for problematic images of child sexual abuse , and A New Life was roundly criticised for its aestheticisation of sexual violence and human trafficking. Catherine Breillat is also well-known for making essentialist claims about gender such as with the voiceover in Romance saying that “women are capable of much more love than men”, while in interviews, Breillat has claimed that “women, they truly love men. I’m not sure that men ever love women”.

Controversy 
Several films associated with the New Extremity have generated significant controversy upon their premieres. Trouble Every Day, Irreversible, and Twentynine Palms were noteworthy for prompting widespread walkouts among audience members. 

Baise-moi was protested against in France by religious groups, leading to a de facto ban on it by the Culture Minister, a decision that itself was then protested by filmmakers resulting in the introduction of a new ‘18’ certificate to cater just for the film. Baise-moi was also subject to controversy in many countries because of its inclusion of visible penetration in an early rape scene – in the UK, this scene would be cut by the BBFC until the decision was overturned in 2013. 

One important aspect of new extreme films is the critical controversy that they attract. While individual films are liked more or less by audiences, a huge amount of attention is given to them – in the press, in university settings, in cinephile forums, and on discussion boards. As Mattias Frey notes about extreme cinema in general, it is less important to look at exactly what reviewers say, “much more decisive is the sheer amount of coverage: the more exposure, whether positive or negative, the more value a film accrues”. Moreover, this attention is often quite polarised with praise and attacks of the films being vociferous and strong. Irreversible is a good example of this, and provoked substantial critical debate at the time, with many both praising and criticising the film sometimes even within the same publication: “in journals as diverse as Sight and Sound, in England, and Positif, in France, critics such as Mark Kermode, Nick James, Philippe Rouyer, and Gregory Valens literally sparred in print, damning or acclaiming the qualities of Noe's feature. One faction demanded censure for an amoral treatment of sexual violence; the opposing group called for artistic freedom for an uncompromising portrait of social and sexual dysfunction. Compromise was neither asked for nor given”. While this may sound slightly banal in the grand scheme of things, most films, especially those containing graphic sex and violence, are never discussed by mainstream or cinephile outlets at all, and so such a substantial, and divided, critical interest in what would otherwise be very niche specialist films is very unusual.

Censorship 
As a result of their inclusion of violent and sexual imagery, many new extreme films have been censored around the world, and there have been significant debates around those that were not. Baise-moi was cut in many countries to remove images of penetration during a rape scene, and a gun being inserted into a man’s anus, and was banned elsewhere for its overall pornographic nature. A Serbian Film was banned and cut in many countries for its inclusion of (fictionalised) child sexual abuse imagery. Fat Girl was cut in some jurisdictions because of its final rape scene that appears to show a child accepting and condoning their own rape. See each film’s Wikipedia page for more details. 

There was also significant debate around many of the films, with critics calling for the films to be banned, calling them immoral, or decrying them as lacking artistry. This was particularly notable in the case of Baise-moi, where critical attacks on the film were substantial and unrelenting, with a particular focus on the supposed poor quality of the film. Irreversible was also subject to criticism as ‘pornographic’ and ‘snuff’ with the implication that they should not be passed by classification boards. Graphic sexual imagery, especially those from Breillat in Romance, Anatomy of Hell, and Fat Girl, as well as the mixing of sex and violence in Twentynine Palms and Trouble Every Day was also heavily criticised by critics at the time. In the case of the latter two films, many critics, following Quandt, appeared disappointed at the shift in style and content from well-liked directors Bruno Dumont and Claire Denis, rather than necessarily engaging seriously with the films themselves.

Relation to new French horror 
Contemporary French horror films that have sometimes been associated with the idea of extremity include, Sheitan, Them, High Tension, Frontier(s), Inside, and Martyrs. The Belgian film Calvaire has also been associated with this trend.

Unlike new extreme films, new French horror emphasises gory violence, torture, and monstrous others. The is often an individual or a group who constitutes the violent monster against which the protagonists must struggle, with death and injury following the main characters until the end of the film when they either escape or are defeated by the evil enemy. These films include many horror tropes such as the monstrous or charactered other, the final girl, home invasions, isolated locales, and torture. In this sense they have much in common with ‘torture porn’ or ‘spectacle horror’ films such as like the Saw series and director Eli Roth's Hostel, with Steve Jones identifying Martrys and Frontier(s) as a form of ‘European torture porn’, that functions as a kind of response to American depictions of torture.

Legacy and influence
Many critics and scholars have prophesied the end of extreme cinema. In one sense, there was certainly a high point of production of new extreme films between 1999 and 2010, with waning interest from funding bodies, especially in France for this type of graphic content in the 2010s. Later films such as The Tribe, Raw, Climax and Holiday have suggested that there is still interest in such depictions of violence and sexual violence. The significant interest in Julia Ducournau in France on the release of Raw and her propulsion to the pinnacle of arthouse filmmaking a few years later with her Palme d’Or-winning Titane demonstrate the value that is attached to the innovative storytelling and filmic style associated with new extreme films. However as of the 2020s, it would seem that the kind of filmmaking associated with new extremity has come to an end for now. 

Nonetheless, there remains significant critical and scholarly interest in extreme cinema with many books and articles still being written about the phenomenon, and it looks as though these films will remain an important reference point in 21st-century cinema.

See also
Art horror
Theatre of Cruelty
Extreme cinema
Cinema of Transgression

References
Notes

Further reading

 Barker, Martin. et al. (2007) Audiences And Receptions Of Sexual Violence In Contemporary Cinema. Aberystwyth: University of Wales.
 Barker, Martin. (2010) ‘“Typically French”?: Mediating Screened Rape to British Audiences’, in Dominique Russell (ed.) Rape in art cinema. New York, NY: Continuum, pp. 147–158.
 Batori, Anna. (2023) The Extreme Cinema of Eastern Europe Rape, Art, (S)Exploitation. Edinburgh: Edinburgh University Press.
 Beugnet, Martine. (2007) Cinema and sensation: French film and the art of transgression. Edinburgh: Edinburgh University Press.
 Downing, Lisa. (2004) ‘French Cinema’s New “Sexual Revolution”: Postmodern Porn and Troubled Genre’, French Cultural Studies, 15(3), pp. 265–280. Available at: https://doi.org/10.1177/009715580401500305.
 Frey, Mattias. (2016) Extreme Cinema: The Transgressive Rhetoric of Today’s Art Film Culture. London: Rutgers University Press.
 Grønstad, Asbjørn. (2012) Screening the unwatchable: spaces of negation in post-millennial art cinema. New York, NY: Palgrave Macmillan.
 Hobbs, Simon. (2018) Cultivating Extreme Art Cinema: Text, Paratext and Home Video Culture. Edinburgh: Edinburgh University Press.
 Horeck, Tanya. and Kendall, Tina. (eds) (2011) The New Extremism in Cinema: From France to Europe. Edinburgh: Edinburgh University Press.
 Kenny, Oliver. (2023) Transgressive Art Films: Extremity, Ethics, and Controversial Images of Sex and Violence. Edinburgh: Edinburgh University Press.
 Kerner, Aaaron. and Knapp, Jonathan. (2016) Extreme Cinema: Affective Strategies in Transnational Media. Edinburgh: Edinburgh University Press.
 Palmer, Tim. (2011) Brutal intimacy: analyzing contemporary French cinema. Middletown, CT: Wesleyan University Press (Wesleyan film).
 Pett, Emma. (2015) ‘A new media landscape? The BBFC, extreme cinema as cult, and technological change’, New Review of Film and Television Studies, 13(1), pp. 83–99. Available at: https://doi.org/10.1080/17400309.2014.982910.
 Sacco, Daniel. (2023) Film Regulation in a Cultural Context. Edinburgh: Edinburgh University Press.
 Selfe, Melanie. (2010) ‘“Incredibly French”?: Nation as an Interpretative Context for Extreme Cinema’, in Lucy Mazdon and Catherine Wheatley (eds) Je t’aime... moi non plus: Franco-British cinematic relations. New York: Berghahn Books, pp. 153–167.
 Tarr, Carrie. (2010) ‘Mutilating and Mutilated Bodies: Women’s Takes on “Extreme” French Cinema’, in Flavia Laviosa (ed.) Visions of struggle in women’s filmmaking in the Mediterranean. 1st ed. New York, NY: Palgrave Macmillan, pp. 63–80.

Cinema of France
Movements in cinema
Obscenity controversies in film
Body horror
2000s in French cinema
2010s in French cinema
Horror films by genre
French horror films
2020s in French cinema